Acraga angulifera is a moth in the family Dalceridae. It was described by Schaus in 1905. It is found in Trinidad, Venezuela, Suriname and French Guiana. The habitat consists of tropical moist forests.

References

Moths described in 1905
Dalceridae